Pieksämäki sub-region  is a subdivision of Southern Savonia and one of the Sub-regions of Finland since 2009.

Municipalities
 Joroinen
 Juva
 Pieksämäki

Politics
Results of the 2018 Finnish presidential election:

 Sauli Niinistö   67.2%
 Matti Vanhanen   7.5%
 Paavo Väyrynen   6.9%
 Pekka Haavisto   6.8%
 Laura Huhtasaari   6.2%
 Tuula Haatainen   3.2%
 Merja Kyllönen   1.8%
 Nils Torvalds   0.4%

Sub-regions of Finland
Geography of South Savo